Iresine diffusa, or Juba's bush, is a species of plant in the family Amaranthaceae.

Appearance 
Herb 1–2 m, stem a little grooved, nodes jointed.  Leaves opp, 14 x 7 cm, edge smooth.  Flowers minute, greenish-white, panicle 40 cm long, male more open, female compact, 1 mm.  Seed 0.5 mm.

Folk use
It is used to treat ovary inflammation in Peru.

Chemistry
Drimenes in aerial parts.

References

diffusa
Taxa named by Aimé Bonpland
Taxa named by Alexander von Humboldt